Gracilidris is a genus of dolichoderine ants with nocturnal behaviour; thought to have gone extinct 15-20 million years ago, they have been found in Paraguay, Brazil, and Argentina and were described in 2006.

For the first time, It was recorded that the dolichoderine ant genus Gracilidris and its sole species, G. pombero were found in the Colombia Amazon basin

The single existing fossil in Dominican amber makes the genus a Lazarus taxon. The only known extant species, Gracilidris pombero, nests in small colonies in the soil. These ants have been described only very recently and little is known about them.

Species
 †Gracilidris humiloides (Wilson, 1985)
 Gracilidris pombero Wild & Cuezzo, 2006

References

External links

Dolichoderinae
Ant genera
Hymenoptera of South America
Aquitanian genus first appearances